David L. Fulton is a private collector of Cremonese instruments.
Born in 1944, he grew up in Eugene, Oregon, playing the violin from an early age. He studied mathematics at the University of Chicago, and was concertmaster of the University of Chicago Orchestra while he was there.

Fulton performed professionally with the Hartford Symphony Orchestra as a violinist. In 1970 he founded the Department of Computer Science at Bowling Green State University, serving as Professor and Chairman for 10 years. While still at Bowling Green, he co-founded Fox Software, which ultimately gained international recognition for its database management application, FoxPro. Following the sale of Fox Software to Microsoft in 1992, Dr. Fulton served as Microsoft’s Vice President for Database Products until his retirement in 1994.

Fulton has produced several documentary films about violins and music.  The first was Homage (2008), which won the 2009 Juno award as "Classical Album of the Year: Solo or Chamber Ensemble".  The film features violinist James Ehnes performing on fourteen instruments from Fulton's collection.

The second, Violin Masters: Two Gentlemen of Cremona, (2010), narrated by Alfred Molina and featuring renowned violinists James Ehnes, Joshua Bell, Midori, Itzhak Perlman among others, examines the history and modern use of Stradivari and Guarneri del Gesù violins.  Violin Masters won a 2012 Emmy in the "Documentary - Historical" category.

The most recent film, Transcendence: A Meeting of Greats, (2014), documents the sessions at which the Miró Quartet recorded Schubert's great String Quartet No. 15, in G Major, D. 887.  This film was nominated for two 2014 Emmy awards in the Special Event Coverage category, winning Best Director in that category.

In January 2022 Fulton published a book about his violin collection entitled The Fulton Collection - A Guided Tour.  This deluxe 1st edition volume is a large-format, linen-bound hardcover containing museum-quality photos, archival material, and first-hand recollections.  The Fulton collection may be seen and heard on the book's associated website which features detailed high-definition video of the instruments being played and where the book may be ordered: / Collection Book Website

Notable Instruments 
ViolinsStradivari La Pucelle 1709
Stradivari "General Kyd, Perlman" 1714 
Stradivari Marsick 1715
Stradivari "Baron d'Assignies" 1713 
Stradivari "Alba, Herzog, Coronation" 1719
Stradivari "Sassoon" 1733
Stradivari "Baron Knoop, Bevan" 1715
Guarneri del Gesù "King Joseph" 1737
Guarneri del Gesù "Stern, Panette, Balâtre, Alard" 1737 
Guarneri del Gesù "Lord Wilton" 1742
Guarneri del Gesù "Haddock" 1734
Guarneri del Gesù "d'Egville" 1735
Guarneri del Gesù "Kemp, Emperor" 1738 
Guarneri del Gesù "Carrodus" 1743
Pietro Guarneri, of Mantua "Shapiro" 1698
Carlo Bergonzi "Kreisler, Perlman" 1735(?)
Giovanni Battista Guadagnini, Turin 1778
Violas
Andrea Guarneri "Conte Vitale" 1676
Gasparo da Salò "Krasner, Kelley" c. 1580
Giuseppe Guadagnini "Wanamaker, Rolla" 1793
Antonio & Girolamo Amati, Cremona 1619
Girolamo Amati (Hieronymus II or Girolamo Amati (II) 1703
Vincenzo Rugeri, Cremona 1697
cellos 
Stradivari "Bass of Spain, Adam" 1713
Pietro Guarneri, of Venice "Beatrice Harrison" 1739
Montagnana "George Gudgeon" 1737
Giuseppe Guarneri del Gesù "Messeas" 1731

References

1944 births
Living people
American collectors
University of Chicago alumni
Bowling Green State University faculty
People from Eugene, Oregon